Wernicke syndrome is an ambiguous term.  It may refer to:

Wernicke aphasia: the eponymous term for receptive or sensory aphasia.
Wernicke encephalopathy: an acute neurological syndrome of ophthalmoparesis, ataxia, and encephalopathy brought on by thiamine deficiency.
Wernicke–Korsakoff syndrome, also called Korsakoff psychosis: a subacute dementia syndrome, often following Wernicke encephalopathy, characterized clinically by confabulation and clinicopathologically correlated with degeneration of the mammillary bodies.

See also
Carl Wernicke (1848–1905), the neurologist who described all of these syndromes.
Wernicke's area, named after Carl Wernicke, a brain region associated with the understanding of written and spoken language.